John Campbell (19 August 1872 – 2 December 1947) was a Scottish footballer, who played for Celtic, Aston Villa, Third Lanark and the Scotland national team.

Career
Campbell was born in Glasgow and began his football career at Junior team Benburb before stepping up to join Celtic in 1890, where he won two league championship titles in season 1892–93 and 1893–94 as well as the Scottish Cup in 1892.

He moved to English club Aston Villa in the summer of 1895 and won the English league title in 1895–96, while leading the league in goals with 22. Villa retained the league title in 1896–97 and Campbell scored in the club's FA Cup final triumph against Everton to win the domestic double. Just days later he had the honour of scoring the first goal at Villa Park.

He returned to Celtic soon after and won another league title in season 1897–98 plus a further two Scottish Cup winners medals in 1899 and 1900. He moved to Third Lanark in 1903 and helped them to the league title in his first season with the club, having scored a Glasgow Cup-winning goal against his former employers in the opening part of the season, although he did not play in Thirds' Scottish Cup win of 1905. He retired in 1906.

Campbell was capped twelve times by Scotland between 1893 and 1903. He scored four goals, including two against Ireland in March 1900. He captained Scotland against Wales in 1902.

See also
List of Scotland national football team captains

Notes

References

External links
Scotland profile at www.londonhearts.com
Aston Villa profile

1872 births
1947 deaths
Association football forwards
Aston Villa F.C. players
Celtic F.C. players
First Division/Premier League top scorers
Scotland international footballers
Scottish Football League players
Scottish Football League representative players
Scottish footballers
Footballers from Glasgow
English Football League players
Third Lanark A.C. players
Scottish Junior Football Association players
Benburb F.C. players
Scottish league football top scorers
Place of death missing
FA Cup Final players